Sheikh Kafumba Konneh (4 February 1944 – 20 July 2015) was a Liberian Muslim leader, prominent peace activist and member of the Truth and Reconciliation Commission of Liberia, which was founded in 2005. He died in Tope Village, Gardnersville, Monrovia in 2015.

Sources

 Biography at trcofliberia.org

1944 births
2015 deaths
Liberian activists
Liberian Muslims
Liberian anti-war activists